Eastern Market is a commercial district in Detroit, Michigan. It is located approximately one mile (1.6 km) northeast of the city's downtown and is bordered on the south by Gratiot Avenue, the north by Mack Avenue, the east by St. Aubin Street, and the west by  Interstate 75 (I-75, Chrysler Freeway). It is sometimes referred to as the “Little Italy” of Detroit, although the Italian community has no tight-knit ethnic neighborhood present-day. The district was designated a Michigan State Historic Site in 1974 and listed on the National Register of Historic Places in 1978; the district's boundary was increased in 2007. The Eastern Market is located on the city's central east side near St. Joseph Roman Catholic Church and the Lafayette Park neighborhood. The market was transferred from city management in 2006, and now operates through a public-private partnership with the Eastern Market Corporation. Eastern Market is the largest historic public market district in the United 
States, and the Eastern Market farmer's distribution center is the largest open-air flowerbed market in the United States and has more than 150 foods and specialty businesses. On Saturdays, about 45,000 people shop the city's historic Eastern Market.

History

The Farmer's Market in Detroit was first opened in 1841 at Cadillac Square in the downtown area. In the 1850s, additional markets were opened on the east side of the city (the present location of Eastern Market) and the west side at the corner of Michigan Ave and 18th Street, later the site of a freeway interchange. In the beginning, the eastern market was devoted to hay and wood sales, but in 1891, sales sheds were built and the Farmer's Market was moved from Cadillac Square to its present location and renamed Eastern Market.

The Eastern Market grew through the following decades, and additional sheds were constructed in 1922 and 1929. Following World War II, more wholesalers and food processors moved into the area, and Eastern Market developed into an important hub for the wholesale food distribution industry.

In 1970, the stalls rented by farmers were decorated with paintings of produce and livestock. Over the years, these murals have become Eastern Market logos.

Present use
States. Eastern Market is a selling point for a wide variety of produce, meat, spice and other products. It is particularly busy on Saturdays, when farmers tend to bring in their poultry and livestock, along with fresh produce, for sale. Although the market is in the largest historic public market district in the U.S., the market itself is operated by the private sector though a public-private partnership with the Eastern Market Corporation. The Eastern Market Corporation has operated the property since 2006. According to Jennifer Knott Giering, President of the Dearborn, Michigan Chamber of Commerce, "Since [privatization in] July 2006, the market has renovated infrastructure, increased attendance and has become a catalyst for development in the [surrounding] neighborhood." Although there is official Detroit Lions tailgating at Ford Field, many tailgaters prefer Eastern Market for Lions home game tailgating.

Local and internationally recognized art galleries, studios and makerspaces have recently established spaces nearby, including The Red Bull House of Art, OmniCorp Detroit, Inner State Gallery, Riopelle and Project. Independent eateries, shops and performance spaces such as Trinosophes, Antietam, and People's Records have arrived in storefront spaces along Gratiot Avenue, and light manufacturing and e-commerce retailers including 1xRun and Cyberoptix continue to operate out of upper floors.

The Detroit Festival of Books is a free annual event, which takes place the third Sunday in July at Eastern Market, and attracts over 10,000 attendees.

Gallery

References

Further reading

External links

EasternMarket.com
Historic Photograph Tour of Eastern Market at the Walter P. Reuther Library
Detroit Festival of Books at Eastern Market

Food markets in the United States
Historic districts in Detroit
Commercial buildings in Detroit
Culture of Detroit
Neighborhoods in Detroit
Historic districts on the National Register of Historic Places in Michigan
Michigan State Historic Sites in Wayne County, Michigan
National Register of Historic Places in Detroit
1841 establishments in Michigan
Tourist attractions in Detroit